Akraifnia is a former municipality in Boeotia, Greece. It was established in 1997 from the former communities Akraifnio, Kastro and Kokkino. Since the 2011 local government reform it is part of the municipality Orchomenos, of which it is a municipal unit. The municipal unit has an area of 185.816 km2. Population 2,752 (2011). The seat of the municipality was in Akraifnio. It was named after the ancient city Acraephia.

References

Populated places in Boeotia